Nobody's Fool is a 1986 comedy film written by playwright Beth Henley.  It stars Rosanna Arquette, Eric Roberts and Mare Winningham.

Plot
Cassie (Rosanna Arquette) who seeks love and escape from her mundane ordinary life meets a traveling Shakespeare troupe offering a community acting workshop.

Cast
 Rosanna Arquette as Cassie
 Eric Roberts as Riley
 Mare Winningham as Pat
 Jim Youngs as Billy
 Louise Fletcher as Pearl
 Gwen Welles Shirley
 Stephen Tobolowsky as Kirk
 Charlie Barnett as Nick
 J.J. Hardy as Ralphy
 William Steis as Frank
 Belita Moreno as Jane
 Lewis Arquette as Mr. Fry
 Ronnie Claire Edwards as Bingo
 Ann Hearn as Linda
 Scott Rosensweig as Winston
 Cheli Ann Chew as Prissy Lee

Reception

Critical response
Film critic Michael Wilmington of the Los Angeles Times wrote in his review: "Nobody's Fool doesn't really jell, but it's still a sometimes rhapsodically goofy experience. If Arquette doesn't really hold the center together, she at least flies off ravishingly at the edges. The movie is a fond valentine to the special salvations of theater. It's an ode to a squeezed heartland, small-town desperation and sheer, stunning blind love."

Release
Nobody's Fool was released on November 7, 1986 in 290 theatres and grossed $258,100 in its opening weekend.

The film was released on DVD on January 25, 2005, by MGM Home Entertainment.

References

External links
 
 

1986 films
1986 romantic comedy films
Films with screenplays by Beth Henley
Films scored by James Newton Howard
American romantic comedy films
1980s English-language films
1980s American films